"The Teddy Bears' Picnic" is a song with melody by John Walter Bratton in 1907, and lyrics added by Jimmy Kennedy in 1932.

Teddy Bears' Picnic may also refer to:

Teddy Bears' Picnic (film), a 2002 film by Harry Shearer
The Teddy Bears' Picnic, 1983 book based on the song lyrics, illustrated by Alexandra Day
The Teddy Bears' Picnic, 1989 short film, precursor to The Secret World of Benjamin Bear
Teddy Bears' Picnic, 2006 short film by Justin Bastard Sane
The Teddy Bears' Picnic, 1988 stage play by David Pinner
Teddy Bears' Picnic, a festival in Winnipeg
Teddy Bears' Picnic, part of Island Bay festival